Ulisses Rocha de Oliveira (born 25 March 1989), known as Ulisses, is a Brazilian football player who plays for Luxembourgish club Differdange 03.

Club career
He made his professional debut in the Campeonato Brasileiro Série B for América Mineiro on 29 May 2010 in a game against Ipatinga.

References

External links
 

1989 births
Footballers from Belo Horizonte
Living people
Brazilian footballers
Association football midfielders
América Futebol Clube (MG) players
Campinense Clube players
Tupi Football Club players
Uberaba Sport Club players
Goiás Esporte Clube players
Clube Esportivo Bento Gonçalves players
Anápolis Futebol Clube players
Villa Nova Atlético Clube players
Louletano D.C. players
C.D. Fátima players
U.D. Leiria players
U.D. Vilafranquense players
CD El Ejido players
S.C.U. Torreense players
FC Differdange 03 players
Campeonato Brasileiro Série B players
Campeonato Brasileiro Série A players
Campeonato Brasileiro Série D players
Campeonato de Portugal (league) players
Liga Portugal 2 players
Segunda División B players
Luxembourg National Division players
Brazilian expatriate footballers
Brazilian expatriate sportspeople in Portugal
Expatriate footballers in Portugal
Brazilian expatriate sportspeople in Spain
Expatriate footballers in Spain
Brazilian expatriate sportspeople in Luxembourg
Expatriate footballers in Luxembourg